is a passenger railway station located in the town of Chizu, Yazu District, Tottori, Japan. It is operated by the third-sector semi-public railway operator Chizu Express.

Lines

Layout
The station consists of two ground-level opposed side platforms with simple shelter facilities for passengers. The platforms are connected by a level crossing. There is no station building, and the station is unattended.

Platforms

Adjacent stations

Gallery

History
Koi-Yamagata Station opened on 3 December 1994 with the opening of the Chizu Line.

On 9 June 2013, as a nod to "koi" (the Japanese word for love) appearing in the station's name, the station's shelters and fences were repainted in vivid pink, and the station's signs were replaced with heart-shaped equivalents.

Passenger statistics
In fiscal 2018, the station was used by an average of 5 passengers daily.

Surrounding area
 Yamagata Elementary School (closed)
Japan National Route 373

See also
 List of railway stations in Japan
 Yamagata (disambiguation)

References

External links

 Koi-Yamagata Station information 

Chizu Express
Railway stations in Tottori Prefecture
Railway stations in Japan opened in 1994
Chizu, Tottori